RFinder ("repeater finder") is a subscription-based website and mobile app. RFinder's main service is the World Wide Repeater Directory (WWRD), which is a directory of amateur radio repeaters. RFinder is the official repeater directory of several amateur radio associations. RFinder has listings for several amateur radio modes, including FM, D-STAR, DMR, and ATV.

World Wide Repeater Directory 
Repeaters are listed in the directory along with its call sign, Maidenhead Locator System and GPS coordinates, transmit/receive offset ("split"), CTCSS and DCS squelch settings, and VoIP settings (IRLP and Echolink nodes). The directory has over 50,000 repeater listings in over 170 countries.

Website 
The directory is available via the RFinder website, with several custom search options.

Forums  
RFinder user forums is for help and support for the app and hardware.

Mobile app 
RFinder has mobile apps for Android and iOS. When using the mobile app, RFinder can display the distance to repeaters, based on the mobile device's current location.

ARRL Repeater Directory 
The ARRL publishes the ARRL Repeater Directory which contains over 31,000 repeater listings for the US and Canada with listings provided by RFinder.

Subscription 
RFinder requires a subscription. A one-year subscription is US$12.99.

Radio programming software 
Some radio programming software applications can query RFinder and download repeater listing to program radios. Compatible software includes:
 CHIRP
 RT Systems

Radio associations 
RFinder is the official repeater directory of the following associations:
 Amateur Radio Society Italy
 American Radio Relay League
 Cayman Amateur Radio Society
 Deutscher Amateur Radio Club
 Federacion Mexicana de Radio Experimentadores
 L’association Réseau des Émetteurs Français
 Lietuvos Radijo Mėgėjų Draugija
 Liga de Amadores Brasilieros de Radio Emissão
 Radio Amateurs of Canada
 Radio Society of Great Britain
 Rede dos Emissores Portugueses
 Unión de Radioaficionados Españoles

References

External links 
 Official website

Amateur radio
Maidenhead
Mobile applications
Subscription services